is a Japanese professional wrestler signed to Tokyo Joshi Pro Wrestling. Yamashita was trained by DDT Pro Wrestling's Kyohei Mikami, and made her debut in August 2013 as one of the first members of DDT's all female Tokyo Joshi Pro sister promotion.

Yamashita was pushed as the top star of Tokyo Joshi Pro, and became the first ever Princess of Princess Champion on January 4, 2016. Yamashita has gone on to hold the title for a combined total of 1,065 days over the course of three title reigns, both records, and has come to be recognized as the promotion's ace.

Professional wrestling career

Tokyo Joshi Pro (2013–present) 
Yamashita trained in Kyokushin and mixed martial arts from a young age and originally had hopes of being an idol, and took part in many auditions for idol groups, though she struggled to get anywhere. She was eventually introduced to professional wrestler Kyohei Mikami, who asked if she would be interested in training to join Dramatic Dream Team's new sister promotion, Tokyo Joshi Pro. Yamashita accepted the offer and moved to Tokyo at age 17 to begin training under Mikami shortly after. In TJP's early years, it was a small promotion that mainly ran shows alongside live music and other live performances. Despite being a small promotion, Yamashita was still being pushed as the future top star of the promotion, and when TJP finally started to run their own full shows, Yamashita took her position at the top of the card. She became known for her strong kicks and karate based offence, earning the nickname "Pink Striker". 

On January 4, 2016, at TJP's biggest show to date, Yamashita defeated longtime rival Shoko Nakajima to become the first ever Tokyo Princess of Princess Champion. She held the title until September when she was defeated by Yuu. In August 2017, she received her first singles match against Sendai Girls' Pro Wrestling's Meiko Satomura, but was defeated. On January 4, 2018, Yamashita got one more chance to win back the Tokyo Princess of Princess Championship, and defeated Reika Saiki to win the championship for a second time. Yamashita retained the title throughout 2018, defeating the likes of Yuna Manase, Veda Scott, Priscilla Kelly, Yuu, Maho Kurone and Rika Tatsumi. On January 4, 2019, she defeated Maki Ito to mark 1 year as champion, the longest in the titles history. At WWN Mercury Rising 2019, Yamashita defeated Allysin Kay in a title vs title match to win the Shine Championship. On May 4, 2021, Yamashita defeated Rika Tatsumi to claim the Princess of Princess Championship for a third time.  On November 13 Yamashita became the 14th Pro Wrestling EVE Champion defeating Alex Windsor for the Pro-Wrestling: EVE Championship on show 2 of WrestleQueendom 5 in London England.

Other ventures

Yamashita has appeared on two TV programs, the 2019 miniseries Prescription Police and the 2020 episode "Ekitai Rashku" of SWAT.

Championships and accomplishments 
 DDT Pro-Wrestling
 Ironman Heavymetalweight Championship (3 times)
 Shine Wrestling
 Shine Championship (1 time)
 Pro-Wrestling: EVE
 Pro-Wrestling: EVE Championship (1 time, current)
Pro Wrestling Illustrated
 Ranked No. 12 of the top 150 female wrestlers in the PWI Women's 150 in 2022
 Tokyo Joshi Pro Wrestling
 Princess of Princess Championship (3 times)
 Princess Tag Team Championship (1 time, current) – with Maki Itoh
 "Futari wa Princess" Max Heart Tournament (2023) – with Maki Itoh

Footnotes

References

External links 
  Miyu Yamashita

1995 births
Japanese female professional wrestlers
Living people
People from Fukuoka
21st-century professional wrestlers
Ironman Heavymetalweight Champions